Dorf's Golf Bible is a 1988 comedy short film starring Tim Conway, Eddie Deezen and Michele Smith along with a special appearance by Sam Snead.

Cast 
Tim Conway as Dorf
Eddie Deezen as Waldo
Michele Smith as Boom Boom, the Angel of Numbers
Sam Snead as himself, a golf tutor to Dorf.

Characters 
Derk Dorf is the main character and the voice-over. He is playing a game of golf when, apparently, a voice over commands what he does. For example, the voice over said for Dorf to keep his left elbow in, and he did and sliced it just as the voice-over said. Apparently Dorf re-enacts whatever the Golf bible commandments are.

Waldo is Dorf's caddy. He first arrives late and does not know the terms of Golf. He also can distract or annoy Dorf whenever he is trying to golf. For example, Dorf asks for a tee, Waldo gives him a cup of hot tea. He replaces Leonard, who filled an identical role in Dorf on Golf.

Boom Boom is the beautiful, curvaceous blonde Angel of numbers. She gives out the commandments as the voice-over calls them out. She puts Roman numerals on a stone that has been flattened for her to put them on.

Sam Snead plays himself.  The Golf Legend, Referred to as "Slammin' Sam", gives Dorf lessons on his swing, his grip, and other elements of his game.  However, when Dorf performs these to disastrous results, he laughs heartily at Dorf's Failure.  An oft-quoted line in the video is Sam's "Why don't you quit?", which is repeated by Sam on the Driving Range, and by Dorf's Dog in his backyard.

Props 
Target - Dorf used a target to pretend that he was in the U.S. Open Golf Tournament. Apparently, he broke his neighbor's window by hitting the ball over the fence.

Sandwich - Dorf asked for a Sand Wedge, apparently he got a sandwich to hit the ball out of the sand.

Motorized Putter - Dorf used a motorized putter to putt the ball to the hole. Apparently, it backfired on him.

Puns and Jokes 
Injuries There have been many bad things that have happened to him. One is the ball hitting his head. When he stole somebody's 9-iron he hit it to a tree and it hit him back in the head with the same sound effect. Another joke was when he was hit by the brick when he was hitting the target pretending to be in the U.S. Open.

Dorf's wife - Dorf's wife is constantly bothered that Dorf is spending too much time playing Golf and not spending time with her. Dorf usually calls her a name such as "My honey bucket, my sweetie pie, my darlin' lump of loveliness." Apparently when she's not listening, Dorf will talk behind her back.

External links 
 

Dorf's Golf Bible
Golf Bible
Dorf's Golf Bible
1980s sports comedy films
1987 comedy films
1988 comedy films
1988 films
1980s English-language films
Films directed by Roger Beatty